The Woosnam's brush-furred rat (Lophuromys woosnami)  is a species of rodent in the family Muridae.
It is found in Burundi, the Democratic Republic of the Congo, Rwanda, and Uganda. Its natural habitat types include mountain forest clearings and bamboo forests.

References

Lophuromys
Mammals described in 1906
Taxonomy articles created by Polbot